Michael Rod Barfoot (born 18 July 1980) is a former English cricketer.  Barfoot was a right-handed batsman who bowled right-arm fast-medium.  He was born at Cheltenham, Gloucestershire.

Barfoot represented the Worcestershire Cricket Board in a single List A match against the Kent Cricket Board in the 1999 NatWest Trophy.

References

External links
Michael Barfoot at Cricinfo
Michael Barfoot at CricketArchive

1980 births
Living people
Sportspeople from Cheltenham
English cricketers
Worcestershire Cricket Board cricketers